Minuscule 548 (in the Gregory-Aland numbering), ε 1015 (in the Soden numbering), is a Greek minuscule manuscript of the New Testament, on parchment. Palaeographically it has been assigned to the 11th century.
Scrivener labelled it by number 535.

Description 

The codex contains the text of the four Gospels on 166 parchment leaves (size ), with one lacunae (John 16:27-19:40). It is written in one column per page, 26 lines per page.

There is also a division according to the Ammonian Sections, (no references to the Eusebian Canons).

There is a musical notation on the first four leaves, and the first nine lines of St. John are in gold.

Text 

The Greek text of the codex is a representative of the Byzantine text-type. Hermann von Soden included it to the textual family Kx. Aland placed it in Category V.
According to the Claremont Profile Method it represents Kx in Luke 1 and Luke 20. In Luke 10 no profile was made.

History 

Formerly the manuscript was held in the monastery Mar Saba. In 1834 Robert Curzon, Lord Zouche, brought this manuscript to England (along with the codices 552, 553, and 554). The entire collection of Curzon was bequeathed by his daughter in 1917 to the British Museum, where it had been deposited, by his son, since 1876.

The manuscripts was added to the list of the New Testament manuscript by F. H. A. Scrivener (535) and C. R. Gregory (548). It was examined by Scrivener, Burgon, and Gregory (in 1883).

It is currently housed at the British Library (Add MS 39591) in London.

See also 

 List of New Testament minuscules
 Biblical manuscript
 Textual criticism

References

Further reading 

 S. Emmel, Catalogue of Materials for Writing, Early Writings on Tablets and Stones, rolled and other Manuscripts and Oriental Manuscript Books, in the Library of the Honourable Robert Curzon (London 1849).
 Facsimiles of Ancient Manuscripts, ed. E. M. Thompson and others, II (London 1913-34), 79

External links 

Greek New Testament minuscules
11th-century biblical manuscripts
British Library additional manuscripts